Marcelino Guerra (April 6, 1890 – date unknown) was a Cuban outfielder in the Negro leagues and Cuban League in the 1910s and 1920s. 

A native of Unión de Reyes, Cuba, Guerra made his Cuban League debut in 1909 with Club Fé and would play for Almendares, Habana, and San Francisco Park. He made his Negro leagues debut in 1916 with the Cuban Stars (East). He went on to play seven seasons with the Cuban Stars (West).

References

External links
 and Baseball-Reference Black Baseball stats and Seamheads

1890 births
Place of death missing
Year of death missing
Almendares (baseball) players
San Francisco Park players
Club Fé players
Cuban Stars (East) players
Cuban Stars (West) players
Habana players
Baseball outfielders
Cuban baseball players
People from Matanzas Province